The 2008 FIA GT Oschersleben 2 Hours was the fourth round of the 2008 FIA GT Championship season.  It took place at Motorsport Arena Oschersleben, Germany, on June 6, 2008.

Race results
Class winners in bold.  Cars failing to complete 75% of winner's distance marked as Not Classified (NC).  Cars with a C under their class are running in the Citation Cup, with the winner marked in bold italics.

Statistics
 Pole Position – #33 Jetalliance Racing – 1:23.748
 Average Speed – 145.01 km/h

References

Oschersleben
FIA GT Oschersleben